"Mienai Chikara ~Invisible One~ / Move" is the nineteenth single and first Double A-side by B'z, released on March 6, 1996. The release is one of the band's many number-one singles in the Oricon chart. "Mienai Chikara ~Invisible One~" was used as the first ending theme of anime series Hell Teacher Nūbē. It sold over 1,236,000 copies according to Oricon.

Track listing 

Move

Certifications

References

External links
B'z official website

1996 singles
B'z songs
Anime songs
Oricon Weekly number-one singles
Songs written by Tak Matsumoto
Songs written by Koshi Inaba